Antoinette Tubman Stadium is a multi-purpose stadium located in Monrovia, Liberia. It is used mostly for football matches. It has a capacity of 10,000 spectators.

In 2014 it was converted into an Ebola treatment unit.

References

See also
Ebola virus epidemic in Liberia

Sports venues in Liberia
Football venues in Liberia
Multi-purpose stadiums in Liberia
Sport in Monrovia
Buildings and structures in Monrovia
Liberia Petroleum Refining Company Oilers
Monrovia Club Breweries
LISCR FC
Monrovia Black Star FC